Odd Soul is the third full-length release from New Orleans group Mutemath. The album was released by Teleprompt Records and Warner Bros. Records on October 4, 2011. It is the first album without original guitarist Greg Hill. Bassist Roy Mitchell Cardenas filled in on guitar duties during writing and recording.  The album was recorded at Paul Meany's house in New Orleans with no involvement by record company executives. In various interviews band members stated that the process of creating the album was very collaborative with all members playing guitar.

Tour
Prior to the album's release, the band embarked on the "Odd Soul Introduction Tour", going back to smaller intimate club settings, rather than the mid-level theaters featured throughout the Armistice tour. The band played Odd Soul album in its entirety, as well as some tracks from previous albums. Their stage show included the usage of 3D projections.

Reception
Odd Soul received generally positive reviews upon its release. At Metacritic, which assigns a normalized rating out of 100 to reviews from mainstream critics, the album received an average score of 80, based on 5 reviews, with many reviewers praising the band's new blues-influenced sound. It debuted at number 24 on the US Billboard 200, and at number 70 in Canada.

The album debuted at  No. 24 on the Billboard 200 albums chart on its first week of release, selling around 13,000 copies in the United States in its first week. It also debuted at No. 8 on Billboard's Rock Albums chart.  and No. 7 on the Alternative Albums chart. As of October 2015, the album has sold 54,000 copies in the US.

Track listing
All songs written and composed by Mutemath

Personnel
 Paul Meany – vocals, keyboards, guitar
 Darren King – drums, guitar
 Roy Mitchell-Cárdenas – bass, guitars

References

2011 albums
Mutemath albums
Warner Records albums